Obaidullah Aleem (12 June 1939 – 18 May 2003) was a Pakistani poet of Urdu language.

Life
Aleem was born in 1939 in Bhopal, India. His father moved to Sialkot following Partition. Aleem was from a Kashmiri Butt family and was an Ahmadi. 

He received an MA in Urdu from the University of Karachi and began working as a radio and television producer until 1967.

In 1974, his first book of poetry Chand Chehra Sitara Ankhhen was published. He was senior producer at Karachi station Pakistan Television Corporation until he was forced to resign in 1978 following an edict against him.

His book of poetry received the highest award in literature in Pakistan, the Adamji Prize. He wrote an article, in memory of Khalifatul Masih III in 1982. His second collection of poetry  was published in 1986.

In March 1998 he suffered a severe heart attack in Punjab and was treated in Fazl-e-Omar Hospital for a few days. He returned to his residence at Nazimabad no 4, in Karachi. He died from heart failure, following another heart attack on 18 May 1998.

Bibliography
Chand chehra sitara ankhhen, (1974)
Viran saray ka diya, (1986)
Yei Zindagi Hey Hamari, (Selected Poems)
Men Khhuli Huwi Ik Sachai, (Collected Prose)
Chiragh Jaltey Hen: The Unpublished Poetry of Obaidullah Aleem, (Facsimile edition edited by Rehan Qayoom, 2014)

References

External links
Obaidullah Aleem - Aleem's Ghazals (in videos) sung by famous singers
Obaidullah Aleem - Aleem's Ghazals in Aleem's own videos & his own voice
Obaidullah Aleem - Thoughts of a Poet

Pakistani people of Kashmiri descent
People from Bhopal
Urdu-language poets from Pakistan
1939 births
Poets from Karachi
1998 deaths
20th-century Pakistani poets